The volleyball competition at the 2007 Pan Arab Games was held in November. Qatar beat Bahrain in the final to win the gold medal and the Egyptian team won the third place play-off for the bronze medal.

Competition

Group A

 November 8, 2007
 Kuwait 0-3 Egypt
 Bahrain 3-0 Tunisia

 November 9, 2007
 Kuwait 3-1 Iraq
 Egypt 3-0 Tunisia

 November 10, 2007
 Bahrain 3-0 Iraq
 Kuwait 0-3 Tunisia

 November 11, 2007
 Tunisia 3-0 Iraq
 Bahrain 2-3 Egypt

 November 12, 2007
 Iraq 0-3 Egypt
 Bahrain 3-2 Kuwait

Group B

 November 8, 2007
 Qatar 3-1 Jordan
 Libya 0-3 Saudi Arabia

 November 10, 2007
 Libya 0-3 Jordan
 Saudi Arabia 3-1 Qatar

 November 12, 2007
 Qatar 3-0 Libya
 Jordan 0-3 Saudi Arabia

Knock-out stage

Semifinals
 November 13, 2007
 Bahrain 3-1 Saudi Arabia
 Qatar 3-2 Egypt

The Final
 November 14, 2007
 Qatar 3-1 Bahrain

5th-8th Places
 November 13, 2007
 Tunisia 3-0 Jordan
 Libya 3-2 Kuwait

The 3rd/4th Place
 November 14, 2007
 Egypt 3-1 Saudi Arabia

References
 Pan Arab Games on Goalzz - Volleyball

Pan Arab Games
2007
Events at the 2007 Pan Arab Games